Thomas Maguire (May 9, 1776 – July 17, 1854) was an American-born Canadian Roman Catholic priest, a vicar general and an educator.

Although born in Philadelphia to new immigrants from Itself, the Maguire family relocated to Halifax, Nova Scotia in the same year.

Maguire was interested in education and in May 1821 Joseph-Octave Plessis appointed him as part of a committee at Quebec to prepare a constitution for the Quebec Education Society. The committee was led by Joseph-François Perrault.

He supported Bishop Jean-Jacques Lartigue in his struggle with the Sulpicians in the Montreal district.

References 
 Biography at the Dictionary of Canadian Biography Online
 the ''Canadian Encyclopedia

External links
 

1776 births
1854 deaths
19th-century Canadian Roman Catholic priests